Jared Taylor Wells (born August 20, 1987), who goes by the stage name Deraj, is an American Christian hip hop musician. Mirrors & Medicine, his debut EP, was released by Reflection Music in 2014.

Early life
Deraj was born Jared Taylor Wells, on August 20, 1987. He grew up in Maryland and Virginia.

Personal life
He attended Full Sail University in Orlando, Florida.

Music career
He started to make and pursue music as a career in 2006. Deraj is currently signed to Reflection Music Group. His first EP came out on February 24, 2014, Mirrors & Medicine. It charted on the Billboard Gospel Albums chart at No. 17.

Discography

EPs

References

External links
Deraj at Reflection Music Group

1987 births
Living people
African-American male rappers
African-American Christians
Musicians from Florida
Musicians from Maryland
Musicians from Virginia
American performers of Christian hip hop music
Rappers from Florida
Rappers from Maryland
Rappers from Virginia
Place of birth missing (living people)
Southern hip hop musicians
21st-century American rappers
21st-century American male musicians
21st-century African-American musicians
20th-century African-American people